Nishikawa may refer to:

Places
Nishikawa, Yamagata, a town in Yamagata Prefecture, Japan

People with the surname
Ayako Nishikawa, a medical doctor, a TV talent
Helen Nishikawa, a TV talent in Japan, wife of Kiyoshi Nishikawa (described below)
Ikuo Nishikawa, a voice actor
, Japanese communist and hijacker
, Japanese footballer
Kazuhiro Nishikawa (born 1986), Japanese shogi player
, Japanese shogi player
Kiyoshi Nishikawa, a comedian, former member of House of Councillors
Mineko Nishikawa, a singer
Shusaku Nishikawa, a football (soccer) player (goalkeeper)
So Nishikawa, Japanese-Australian association football player
Takanori Nishikawa aka T.M.Revolution, a musician
, Japanese golfer
, Japanese lawyer and politician

Japanese-language surnames